The 2018 II Lyga season was the second season since return to two divisions system, the twentieth after switch to spring-to-fall format and the thirtieth overall after the restoration of Independence.

The II Lyga is the third-tier of football in Lithuania. It is divided into the South Zone and the West Zone, each containing a total of thirteen clubs. The top two teams from each division are promoted to the I Lyga, while the last placed teams from both divisions are relegated to the appropriate regional division of the III Lyga, except in separately regulated cases for the B teams of higher tier clubs.

II Lyga South Zone

League table

Results

Gold Match
Since Hegelmann Litauen and Šilas finished level on points at the end of the season, a "Gold Match" on neutral pitch will be played to decide the title.

Attendance

II Lyga West Zone

League table

Results

Gold Match
Since Babrungas and Minija finished level on points at the end of the season, a "Gold Match" on neutral pitch was played to decide the title.

Attendance

Number of teams by counties

References

II Lyga
3
Lit
Lit